Ezio Borgo (born November 20, 1907 in Genoa) was an Italian professional football player.

His older brother, Guglielmo Borgo, also played football professionally. To distinguish them, Guglielmo was known as Borgo I and Ezio as Borgo II.

1907 births
Year of death missing
Italian footballers
Serie A players
Juventus F.C. players
Casale F.B.C. players
A.C.R. Messina players
F.C. Grosseto S.S.D. players
Association football midfielders